Cho Soon (1 February 1928 – 23 June 2022) was a South Korean politician who was the first publicly elected mayor of Seoul, serving from 1995 to 1997. Previously, he was the Deputy Prime Minister of South Korea from 1988 to 1990 and the Chief of the Bank of Korea.

Life
Cho Soon was born on February 1, 1928 in the city of Jumunjin, then occupied by the Japanese Empire. He graduated from Seoul National University in 1949 and earned a doctorate from the University of California, Berkley.

As a member of the Grand National Party and later the Democratic People's Party, he held many political positions throughout his life.

Cho became Deputy Prime Minister and Finance Minister of South Korea under President Roh Tae-woo. He was succeeded in the position by Lee Seung-yoon in 1990. In 1992, he became the Chief of the Bank of Korea, a position he left a year later.

In 1995, he ran for Mayor of Seoul, winning the race decisively with 42.4% of the vote. He assumed the office on July 1, 1995, becoming the first elected mayor of the city. Cho later served in the National Assembly from 1998 to 2000.

He died in Seoul on 23 June 2022 of natural causes at the age of 94.

References

1928 births
2022 deaths
20th-century South Korean economists
South Korean bankers
Governors of the Bank of Korea
Mayors of Seoul
Deputy Prime Ministers of South Korea
Kyunggi High School alumni
Bowdoin College alumni
University of California, Berkeley alumni
Academic staff of Seoul National University
South Korean military personnel of the Korean War
People from Gangneung
Seoul National University alumni
Members of the National Academy of Sciences of the Republic of Korea
Pungyang Jo clan
20th-century South Korean politicians